The Fraumünster (lit. in ) is a church in Zürich which was built on the remains of a former abbey for aristocratic women which was founded in 853 by Louis the German for his daughter Hildegard. He endowed the Benedictine convent with the lands of Zürich, Uri, and the Albis forest, and granted the convent immunity, placing it under his direct authority. Today, it belongs to the Evangelical Reformed Church of the canton of Zürich and is one of the four main churches of Zürich, the others being the Grossmünster, Prediger and St. Peter's churches.

History 
In 1045, King Henry III granted the convent the right to hold markets, collect tolls, and mint coins, and thus effectively made the abbess the ruler of the city.

Emperor Frederick II granted the abbey Reichsunmittelbarkeit in 1218, thus making it territorially independent of all authority save that of the Emperor himself, and increasing the political power of the abbess. The abbess assigned the mayor, and she frequently delegated the minting of coins to citizens of the city. A famous abbess during this time of great power was Elisabeth of Wetzikon.

However, the political power of the convent slowly waned in the fourteenth century, beginning with the establishment of the Zunftordnung (guild laws) in 1336 by Rudolf Brun, who also became the first independent mayor, i.e. not assigned by the abbess.

The abbey was dissolved on 30 November 1524 in the course of the reformation of Huldrych Zwingli, supported by the last abbess, Katharina von Zimmern.

The monastery buildings were destroyed in 1898 to make room for the new Stadthaus. The church building today serves as the parish church for one of the city's 34 reformed parishes. Münsterhof, historically the main square and marketplace of the medieval city, is named for the abbey. Gesellschaft zu Fraumünster cultivates the traditions of the former nunnery convent.

Chagall windows 
The choir of the abbey includes 5 large stained glass windows designed by artist Marc Chagall and installed in 1970. Each of the 5 has a dominant color and depicts a Biblical story. From left (northern wall) to right, the 5 works are:

 Prophets, depicting Elijah's ascent to heaven
 Jacob, displaying his combat, and dreams of heaven
 Christ, illustrating various scenes of Christ's life
 Zion, showing an angel trumpeting the end of the world
 Law, with Moses looking down upon the suffering of his people

Equally impressive is the 9m tall stained glass of the North transept, created by Augusto Giacometti in 1940.

Fraumünster's Crypt museum 
Since the last renovation in 1900, the crypt under the choir of the Fraumünster abbey was sealed, and has made public since 19 June 2016. The oldest part of the church preserved the abbey's Holy Relics until the Reformation in Zürich banned the Roman Catholic adoration of saints. The foundations of the crypt date back to the 9th century when the abbey was founded. The crypt also comprises an exhibition on the history of the Reformation in Zürich, on the architecture and local history, assisted by a multimedia information system that illustrates the foundation fragments of the crypt, and how the church was rebuilt from the original Romanesque construction phase to its present Gothic appearance, on occasion of its establishment guided by Dölf Wild, the archaeologist in charge.

Facilities 
For the around 500,000 visitors every year a new developed visitor management started in June 2016. Visitors groups up to 60 persons are admitted from June 20 only by appointment and only in defined time windows. Guided tours are allowed only in a "whisper" modus, and by accredited tour guides, from 10 am to 4 pm in winter, and to 5 pm and 6 pm in spring respectively summer.

The organ 

With 6.959 pipes, the organ at Fraumünster is the largest in the canton of Zurich.

Gallery

Abbesses 
 Hildegard (828-856 or 859), first abbess of Fraumünster Abbey
 Katharina von Zimmern (1478-1547), last abbess of the Abbey

Cultural heritage of national importance 
In the Swiss inventory of cultural property of national and regional significance the Fraumünster is listed as a Class A object of national importance.

Literature 
 Peter Vogelsanger: Zürich und sein Fraumünster. Eine elfhundertjährige Geschichte (853–1956). NZZ Libro, Zürich 1994,

See also 
 Grossmünster
 Wasserkirche

References

External links 

 

Benedictine monasteries in Switzerland
Benedictine nunneries in Switzerland
Museums in Zürich
Archaeological museums in Switzerland
Archaeological sites in Switzerland
History of Zürich
Reformed churches in Zürich
Cultural property of national significance in the canton of Zürich
Christian monasteries established in the 9th century
9th-century establishments in Switzerland
Gothic architecture in Switzerland
Religious buildings and structures completed in 853